Florești, is the capital city and industrial and commercial center of Floreşti District of Moldova. It is located on the river Răut.

Name
The name comes from the Romanian word floare ("flower"). The old name of the settlement was Rădiul Florilor, which is also a derivative from the Romanian word for "flower".

Geography
The city is located in the north of the country, on the river Răut, a tributary of the Dniester.

Politics and administration
Florești is governed by the City Council and the City Mayor, both elected once every four years. The current mayor is Iurie Ţap.

Notable people
 Saul Perlmutter 
 Vitalie Ciobanu 
 Victor Ciobanu (born 1992), world champion wrestler
 Nicolae Timofti
 Tudor Ulianovschi

Gallery

References

Cities and towns in Moldova
Populated places established in 1580
Soroksky Uyezd
Soroca County (Romania)
Florești District